The Wayans Bros. is an American sitcom television series that aired on The WB from January 11, 1995, to May 20, 1999. The series starred real life brothers Shawn and Marlon Wayans. The series also starred John Witherspoon and Anna Maria Horsford (season 2 onward).

Premise
Shawn and Marlon Williams (Shawn Wayans and Marlon Wayans) are brothers who live in an apartment on 117th street in Harlem. Shawn owns a local newsstand, where he and his brother Marlon work on a daily basis.

In the show's second season (in 1995), the newsstand and Pops' Joint, the restaurant owned by their father, John "Pops" Williams (John Witherspoon) were moved downtown into the fictional Neidermeyer Building, in Rockefeller Center, where Dee Baxter (Anna Maria Horsford (onwards from Season 2) works as a security guard.

Season 2 transitions
Many transitions were made in season 2:
 Shawn's former girlfriend, Lisa Saunders (Lela Rochon), did not return for the rest of the series.
 Monique (Paula Jai Parker), a local shopkeeper and Marlon's love interest, did not return after the eleventh episode. Parker first appeared as a love interest of Marlon's in the Season 1 episode "Pulp Marlon". She was only a guest star for the one episode.
 Lou (Jill Tasker), the former security guard, left after the seventh episode and was replaced by Dee Baxter (Anna Maria Horsford).
 White Mike (Mitch Mullany), Shawn and Marlon's ghetto white neighbour, appeared for six episodes of Season 2. He was slated to appear as a recurring character for the rest of the series. But the actor Mitch Mullany ended up getting his own show Nick Freno: Licensed Teacher.
 Shawn formerly worked for APS, yet in Season 2, he works at his newsstand.
 Marlon was working with Pops at the diner, but in Season 2, he worked at the newsstand with Shawn.
 Pops' Joint was a standalone restaurant, and he hired Marlon and Benny, the cook, during Season 1. However, in Season 2, the eatery was moved into the Neidermeyer Building, in Rockefeller Center. It also revealed that Pops' Joint was a historical landmark for the nation's leaders and activists of the Civil Rights Movement.

Cast

Main
 Shawn Wayans as Shawn Williams, a womanizing, stylish and responsible young bachelor and Marlon's older brother. He is an owner of his own local newsstand.
 Marlon Wayans as Marlon Williams, Shawn's dimwitted, immature, sex crazed, unsanitary and lazy younger brother who also works at the newsstand
 John Witherspoon as John "Pops" Williams, Shawn and Marlon's dysfunctional tacky father who owns his locally famed diner right by Shawn and Marlon's newsstand
 Anna Maria Horsford as Deirdre "Dee" Baxter (seasons 2–5), the tough security guard and Shawn, Marlon and Pops' close friend
 Lela Rochon as Lisa Saunders (season 1)
 Paula Jai Parker as Monique (season 2, episodes 1–11)
 Jill Tasker as Lou Malino (season 2, episodes 1–7)

Recurring
 Phill Lewis as Thelonious "T.C." Capricornio (seasons 2–5)
 Mitch Mullany as White Mike (season 2)
 Ja'Net DuBois as Grandma Ellington (seasons 3–4)
 Jermaine 'Huggy' Hopkins as Dupree (seasons 3–5)

Episodes

Production 
The Wayans Bros. was the first of the four sitcoms that aired as part of the original Wednesday night two hour lineup that helped launch the network (along with Unhappily Ever After, The Parent 'Hood and the short-lived Muscle). While in development, the series' working title was initially supposed to have been Brother to Brother, before the name of the series changed to The Wayans Bros.

In the show's second season, in 1995 Pops' Joint (the restaurant owned by Shawn and Marlon's father, John "Pops" Williams) was moved into the Neidermeyer Building, where the location was changed from Harlem to Rockefeller Center, Manhattan.

The series was cancelled in 1999 due to declining ratings and was not given a proper finale.

While the series at least did not end on a cliffhanger ending, in the film Scary Movie (2000), Shawn Wayans' character says: "And The Wayans Bros. was a good show, man. It was a good-ass show, and we didn't even get a final episode."

Theme music and opening sequence
The show's official opening title began with Shawn and Marlon on the steps of a brownstone apartment building, donning afros and wearing 1970s preppy attire, moving in rhythm to an accompanying satirical music piece that's supposed to have a 1970s style "urban" sitcom theme song feel. Marlon forcefully smacks the camera, and then segues into "the real opening" of The Wayans Bros.

The scene then cuts to them with their normal clothes and trying to help an old woman who gets hit by a bus. The camera then shows the brothers inside the bus with the title of the show underneath them. The "second half" part of The Wayans Bros. theme song was changed twice throughout its four-year run (1995–1999). In the first two seasons, the show's theme song was A Tribe Called Quest's "Electric Relaxation".

In the third season, the theme song changed to a four-second hip hop beat. In the final two seasons, the show's theme song was changed again to a regular hip hop instrumental beat (which was produced by the Wayans Bros. & Omar Epps). In Brazilian reruns of seasons one and two episodes that have aired in SBT in 2015, this version replaced the seasons one and two sequence with the season three sequence.

Syndication
Warner Bros. Domestic Television Distribution handles syndication distribution of the series. In September 1999, after the series was cancelled by The WB, the series began airing in off network syndication nationwide.

At that same time, Chicago based national cable superstation WGN began airing reruns of the series, airing the series until 2002 (when its broadcast syndication run also ended); WGN (both the local Chicago feed and the national superstation feed) aired The Wayans Bros. in first run form from 1995 to 1999, when WGN (whose local Chicago feed was an affiliate of the network) carried WB programming nationally to make The WB available to markets where a local affiliate did not exist (The Wayans Bros. is one of three WB series to have aired on WGN in both first run and syndication form; The Parent 'Hood, 7th Heaven and Sister, Sister being the others).

In 2006, reruns began airing on BET, after a four-year absence, where it ran until 2007. In 2007, reruns of the series aired on Ion Television, where it ran until 2008. Since then, several Viacom networks, including MTV2, VH1 and BET Her have run the series in continuous rotation. As of 2023, reruns air frequently on VH1. All five seasons of the show stream on HBO Max and BET+.

Home media
Warner Home Video released Season 1 of The Wayans Bros. on DVD in Region 1.  Warner Archive subsequently released Seasons 2 to 5 on DVD in Region 1.

References

External links
 

1990s American black sitcoms
1990s American sitcoms
1995 American television series debuts
1999 American television series endings
English-language television shows
Hip hop television
Television series by Warner Bros. Television Studios
Television shows set in New York City
Television series about brothers
The WB original programming